Shinto-ryu can refer to several styles of classical Japanese swordsmanship used by the samurai:
 Shintō-ryū
 Tenshin Shōden Katori Shintō-ryū
 Kashima Shintō-ryū
 Kasumi Shintō-ryū Kenjutsu
 Hyōhō Niten Ichi-ryū

or to some other martial art:
 Shintō Musō-ryū, a school of jōjutsu
 Shindo Ryu, a modern style of karate
 Shinto Ryu, a modern style of Taijutsu

See also 
 Koryū